The 1988 season in Swedish football, starting January 1988 and ending December 1988.

Honours

Official titles

Competitions

Promotions, relegations and qualifications

Promotions

Relegations

International qualifications

Domestic results

Allsvenskan 1988

Allsvenskan play-off 1988 
Semi-finals

Final

Division 1 Norra 1988

Division 1 Södra 1988

Svenska Cupen 1987–88 
Final

National team results

Notes

References 
Print

Online

 
Seasons in Swedish football